Valentin Valentinovich Zykov (born 15 May 1995) is a Russian professional ice hockey winger who is currently playing for SKA Saint Petersburg in the Kontinental Hockey League (KHL). He was selected by the Los Angeles Kings in the second round (37th overall) of the 2013 NHL Entry Draft.

Zykov was a top prospect who was ranked number eight on the NHL Central Scouting Bureau's final ranking of North American skaters. He was expected to be a first round selection in the 2013 NHL Entry Draft, but went in the second round, 37th overall, to the Los Angeles Kings.

Playing career
As a 16-year-old, Zykov played in the MHL with CSKA-Krasnaja Armija Moskva, the junior affiliate for HC CSKA Moscow of the Kontinental Hockey League. Zykov was drafted in the second round (76th overall) of the 2012 CHL Import Draft by Baie-Comeau Drakkar, and joined the QMJHL team for the 2012–13 season. As a 17-year-old, Zykov was added to Team Russia's roster for the 2012 Subway Super Series, and in his first QMJHL season Zykov racked up 40 goals and 35 assists for 75 points in 67 games played to win the Michel Bergeron Trophy as the QMJHL's Offensive Rookie of the Year. He was further rewarded for his outstanding played by being named the QMJHL Rookie of the Year.

During the 2014–15 QMJHL season, Zykov was traded from Baie-Comeau to the Gatineau Olympiques in exchange for Václav Karabáček.

After attending the Kings training camp, Zykov was assigned to begin his rookie professional season in 2015–16 with the Ontario Reign of the AHL. Zykov compiled 7 goals and 14 points in 43 games with the Reign before he was traded by the Kings along with a conditional 5th round pick (if Los Angeles advanced to the 2016 Western Conference Final, failed) to the Carolina Hurricanes in exchange for Kris Versteeg on 28 February 2016.

Zykov played his first NHL game and recorded his first NHL goal on 9 March 2017, in a game against the New York Rangers.

Zykov was selected for the 2018 AHL All-Star Game after leading the league in goals scored and beating his own career high in goals. After recording his 30th goal of the season in a game against the Hartford Wolf Pack, Zykov became the first Russian-born skater to score 30 goals or more in an AHL season since Artem Anisimov did so during the 2008–09 season. He was recalled to the NHL for the second time during the 2017–18 season on 19 March 2018. Zykov was voted by fans as the Checkers' best forward of the 2017–18 season following the team's elimination from the 2018 Calder Cup playoffs. At season's end, Zykov led the league in goals with 33, and finished second in team scoring with 54 points.

In the following 2018–19 season, Zykov made the Hurricanes opening season roster. As the club's reserve forward, Zykov was a frequent healthy scratch, and was reassigned on a conditioning loan back to the Checkers on 13 November 2018. He later returned to the Hurricanes and after 13 games having collected 3 assists, Zykov was placed on waivers by the Hurricanes and was claimed by the Edmonton Oilers on 30 November 2018. Zykov appeared in just 5 games with the Oilers over the following month before he was returned to waivers and claimed by the Vegas Golden Knights on 29 December 2018.

As a free agent from the Golden Knights, leading into the pandemic delayed  season, Zykov remained un-signed. He later left North America and joined Swedish second tier club, Modo Hockey of the HockeyAllsvenskan on 12 February 2021. In his short tenure with Modo, he collected 2 goals and 4 points in 7 games.

As a free agent leading into the  season, Zykov returned to his native Russia and agreed to a contract with contending KHL outfit, SKA Saint Petersburg, on 12 October 2021.

Career statistics

Regular season and playoffs

International

Awards and honours

References

External links
 

1995 births
Living people
Baie-Comeau Drakkar players
Carolina Hurricanes players
Charlotte Checkers (2010–) players
Chicago Wolves players
Edmonton Oilers players
Gatineau Olympiques players
Los Angeles Kings draft picks
Modo Hockey players
Ontario Reign (AHL) players
Russian ice hockey left wingers
SKA Saint Petersburg players
Ice hockey people from Saint Petersburg
Vegas Golden Knights players